The Gambia, officially the Republic of The Gambia, is a country in West Africa. It is the smallest country within mainland Africa and is surrounded by Senegal, except for its western coast on the Atlantic Ocean. The Gambia is situated on both sides of the lower reaches of the Gambia River, the nation's namesake, which flows through the centre of the Gambia and empties into the Atlantic Ocean, thus the long shape of the country. Banjul is the Gambian capital and the country's largest metropolitan area, while the largest cities are Serekunda and Brikama.

The Portuguese in 1455 entered the Gambian region, the first Europeans to do so, but never established important trade there. In 1765, the Gambia was made a part of the British Empire by establishment of the Gambia. In 1965, the Gambia gained independence under the leadership of Dawda Jawara, who ruled until Yahya Jammeh seized power in a bloodless 1994 coup. Adama Barrow became the Gambia's third president in January 2017, after defeating Jammeh in the December 2016 elections. Jammeh initially accepted the results, before refusing to leave office, triggering a constitutional crisis and military intervention by the Economic Community of West African States that resulted in his removal two days after his term was initially scheduled to end.

The Gambia is a member of the Commonwealth and English is the sole official language a legacy of its British colonial past. It is nowadays also a member of the Economic Community of West African States and other international organizations. The Gambia's economy is dominated by farming, fishing, and especially tourism. In 2015, 48.6% of the population lived in poverty. In rural areas, poverty was even more widespread, at almost 70%.

Etymology
The name "Gambia" is derived from the Mandinka term Kambra/Kambaa, meaning Gambia River (or possibly from the sacred Serer Gamba, a special type of calabash beaten when a Serer elder dies). Upon independence in 1965, the country used the name the Gambia. Following the proclamation of a republic in 1970, the long-form name of the country became Republic of the Gambia. The administration of Yahya Jammeh changed the long-form name to Islamic Republic of the Gambia in December 2015. On 29 January 2017 President Adama Barrow changed the name back to Republic of the Gambia.

The Gambia is one of only two existing countries for which the definite article is commonly used in its English-language name (the other is The Bahamas), aside from cases in which the name is plural (the Netherlands, the Philippines) or includes the form of government (the United Kingdom, the Czech Republic). The article is also officially used by the country's government and by international bodies. The article was originally used because the region was named after "the Gambia [River]." In 1964, shortly prior to the country's independence, the Prime Minister Dawda Jawara wrote to the Permanent Committee on Geographical Names for British Official Use requesting that the name the Gambia retain the definite article, in part to reduce confusion with Zambia which had also recently become independent. At present, both Gambia and the Gambia are in common use.

History

9th–16th centuries: Muslim and Portuguese influence
Arab traders provided the first written accounts of the Gambia area in the ninth and tenth centuries. During the tenth century, Muslim merchants and scholars established communities in several West African commercial centres. Both groups established trans-Saharan trade routes, leading to a large export trade of local people as slaves, along with gold and ivory, as well as imports of manufactured goods.

By the 11th or 12th century, the rulers of kingdoms such as Takrur (a monarchy centred on the Senegal River just to the north), ancient Ghana and Gao had converted to Islam and had appointed to their courts Muslims who were literate in the Arabic language. At the beginning of the 14th century, most of what is today called the Gambia was part of the Mali Empire. The Portuguese reached this area by sea in the mid-15th century and began to dominate overseas trade.

English and French administration
In 1588, the claimant to the Portuguese throne, António, Prior of Crato, sold exclusive trade rights on the Gambia River to English merchants. Letters patent from Queen Elizabeth I confirmed the grant. In 1618, King James I of England granted a charter to an English company for trade with the Gambia and the Gold Coast (now Ghana). Between 1651 and 1661, some parts of the Gambia — St. Andrew's Island in the Gambia River including Fort Jakob, and St. Mary Island (modern day Banjul) and Fort Jillifree — came under the rule of the Duchy of Courland and Semigallia (now in modern-day Latvia), having been bought by Prince Jacob Kettler. The colonies were formally ceded to England in 1664.

During the late 17th century and throughout the 18th century, the British Empire and the French Empire struggled continually for political and commercial supremacy in the regions of the Senegal River and the Gambia River. The British Empire occupied the Gambia when an expedition led by Augustus Keppel landed there following the capture of Senegal in 1758. The 1783 First Treaty of Versailles gave Great Britain possession of the Gambia River, but the French retained a tiny enclave at Albreda on the river's north bank. This was finally ceded to the United Kingdom in 1856.

Slavery (17th–19th centuries)
As many as three million people may have been taken as slaves from this general region during the three centuries that the transatlantic slave trade operated. It is not known how many people were taken as slaves by intertribal wars before the transatlantic slave trade began. Most of those taken were sold by other Africans to Europeans: some were prisoners of intertribal wars; some were victims sold because of unpaid debts, and many others were simply victims of kidnapping.

Traders initially sent people to Europe to work as servants until the market for labour expanded in the West Indies and North America in the 18th century. In 1807, the United Kingdom abolished the slave trade throughout its empire. It also tried, unsuccessfully, to end the slave trade in the Gambia. Slave ships intercepted by the Royal Navy's West Africa Squadron in the Atlantic were also returned to the Gambia, with people who had been slaves released on MacCarthy Island far up the Gambia River where they were expected to establish new lives. The British established the military post of Bathurst (now Banjul) in 1816.

Gambia Colony and Protectorate (1821–1965)

In the ensuing years, Banjul was at times under the jurisdiction of the British Governor-General in Sierra Leone. In 1888, the Gambia became a separate colony.

An agreement between the British Empire and the French Republic in 1889 established the boundaries of the colony. In 1891, a joint Anglo-French Boundary Commission faced resistance from local leaders whose lands would be divided. The Gambia became a British Crown colony called British Gambia, divided for administrative purposes into the colony (city of Banjul and the surrounding area) and the protectorate (remainder of the territory). The Gambia received its own executive and legislative councils in 1901, and it gradually progressed toward self-government. Slavery was abolished in 1906 and following a brief conflict between the British colonial forces and indigenous Gambians, British colonial authority was firmly established. In 1919, an inter-racial relationship between Travelling Commissioner J K McCallum and Wolof woman Fatou Khan scandalized the administration.

During World War II, some soldiers fought with the Allies of World War II. Though these soldiers fought mostly in Burma, some died closer to home and a Commonwealth War Graves Commission cemetery is in Fajara (close to Banjul). Banjul contained an airstrip for the US Army Air Forces and a port of call for Allied naval convoys.

After World War II, the pace of constitutional reform increased. Following general elections in 1962, the United Kingdom granted full internal self-governance in the following year.

Post-independence (1965–present)

Monarchy and republican democracy
The Gambia achieved independence on 18 February 1965, as a constitutional monarchy within the Commonwealth, with Elizabeth II as Queen of the Gambia, represented by the Governor-General. Shortly thereafter, the national government held a referendum proposing that the country become a republic. This referendum failed to receive the two-thirds majority required to amend the constitution, but the results won widespread attention abroad as testimony to the Gambia's observance of secret balloting, honest elections, civil rights, and liberties.

On 24 April 1970, the Gambia became a republic within the Commonwealth, following a second referendum. Prime Minister Sir Dawda Kairaba Jawara assumed the office of president, an executive post, combining the offices of head of state and head of government. President Sir Dawda Jawara was re-elected five times.

1981 attempted coup
An attempted coup on 29 July 1981 followed a weakening of the economy and allegations of corruption against leading politicians. The coup attempt occurred while President Jawara was visiting London and was carried out by the leftist National Revolutionary Council, composed of Kukoi Samba Sanyang's Socialist and Revolutionary Labour Party (SRLP) and elements of the Field Force, a paramilitary force which constituted the bulk of the country's armed forces.

President Jawara requested military aid from Senegal, which deployed 400 troops to the Gambia on 31 July. By 6 August, some 2,700 Senegalese troops had been deployed, defeating the rebel force. Between 500 and 800 people were killed during the coup and the ensuing violence.
In 1982, in the aftermath of the 1981 attempted coup, Senegal and the Gambia signed a treaty of confederation. The Senegambia Confederation aimed to combine the armed forces of the two states and to unify their economies and currencies. After just seven years, the Gambia permanently withdrew from the confederation in 1989.

1994 Yahya Jammeh coup; return to electoral democracy
In 1994, the Armed Forces Provisional Ruling Council (AFPRC) deposed the Jawara government and banned opposition political activity. Lieutenant Yahya A.J.J. Jammeh, chairman of the AFPRC, became head of state. Jammeh was just 29 years old at the time of the coup. The AFPRC announced a transition plan to return to a democratic civilian government. The Provisional Independent Electoral Commission (PIEC) was established in 1996 to conduct national elections and transformed into the Independent Electoral Commission (IEC) in 1997 and became responsible for the registration of voters and for the conduct of elections and referendums.

In late 2001 and early 2002, the Gambia completed a full cycle of presidential, legislative, and local elections, which foreign observers deemed free, fair, and transparent. President Yahya Jammeh, who was elected to continue in the position he had assumed during the coup, took the oath of office again on 21 December 2001. Jammeh's Alliance for Patriotic Reorientation and Construction (APRC) maintained its strong majority in the National Assembly, particularly after the main opposition United Democratic Party (UDP) boycotted the legislative elections. (It has participated in elections since, however).

On 2 October 2013, the Gambian interior minister announced that the Gambia would leave the Commonwealth with immediate effect, ending 48 years of membership of the organisation. The Gambian government said it had "decided that the Gambia will never be a member of any neo-colonial institution and will never be a party to any institution that represents an extension of colonialism".

On 11 December 2015, President Jammeh declared the Gambia an Islamic republic, calling it a break from the country's colonial past.

Incumbent President Jammeh faced opposition leaders Adama Barrow from the Independent Coalition of parties and Mamma Kandeh from the Gambia Democratic Congress party in the December 2016 presidential elections. The Gambia sentenced main opposition leader and human rights advocate Ousainou Darboe to 3 years in prison in July 2016, disqualifying him from running in the presidential election.

2016 Jammeh defeat in elections
Following the 1 December 2016 elections, the elections commission declared Adama Barrow the winner of the presidential election. Jammeh, who had ruled for 22 years, first announced he would step down after losing the 2016 election before declaring the results void and calling for a new vote, sparking a constitutional crisis and leading to an invasion by an ECOWAS coalition. On 20 January 2017, Jammeh announced that he had agreed to step down and would leave the country.

Since 2017 

In January 2017, President Barrow removed the "Islamic" title from the Gambia's name.

On 14 February 2017, the Gambia began the process of returning to its membership of the Commonwealth and formally presented its application to re-join to Secretary-General Patricia Scotland on 22 January 2018. Boris Johnson, who became the first British Foreign Secretary to visit the Gambia since the country gained independence in 1965, announced that the British government welcomed the Gambia's return to the Commonwealth. The Gambia officially rejoined the Commonwealth on 8 February 2018.

On 28 February 2018, Jaha Dukureh, a women's rights activist was nominated for the Nobel Peace Prize for her work in combating female genital mutilation.

On 4 December 2021, Adama Barrow won re-election in the presidential election.

On 20 December 2022, a supposed coup attempt by the Gambian army was foiled, with four soldiers arrested. The Gambia Armed Forces have denied that any attempt at a coup was made.

Geography

The Gambia is a very small and narrow country whose borders mirror the meandering Gambia River. It lies between latitudes 13 and 14°N, and longitudes 13 and 17°W.

About  (11.5%) of the Gambia's area are covered by water. It is the smallest country on the African mainland. In comparative terms, the Gambia has a total area slightly less than that of the island of Jamaica.

The present boundaries were defined in 1889 after an agreement between the United Kingdom and France. Starting with the placement of boundary markers in 1891, it took nearly 15 years after the Paris meetings to determine the final borders of the Gambia.

The Gambia contains three terrestrial ecoregions: Guinean forest-savanna mosaic, West Sudanian savanna, and Guinean mangroves. It had a 2018 Forest Landscape Integrity Index mean score of 4.56/10, ranking it 120th globally out of 172 countries.

Climate

The Gambia has a tropical savannah climate. A short rainy season normally lasts from June until September, but from then until May, lower temperatures predominate, with less precipitation. The climate in the Gambia closely resembles that of neighbouring Senegal, of Mali, and of the northern part of Guinea.

Government and politics

The Gambia gained independence from the United Kingdom on 18 February 1965. From 1965 to 1994, the country was ostensibly a multi-party liberal democracy. It was ruled by Dawda Jawara and his People's Progressive Party (PPP). However, the country never experienced political turnover during this period and its commitment to succession by the ballot box was never tested. In 1994, a military coup propelled a commission of military officers to power, known as the Armed Forces Provisional Ruling Council (AFPRC). After two years of direct rule, a new constitution was written and in 1996, the leader of the AFPRC, Yahya Jammeh, was elected as president. He ruled in an authoritarian style until the 2016 election, which was won by Adama Barrow, backed by a coalition of opposition parties.

Political history
During the Jawara era, there were initially four political parties, the PPP, the United Party (UP), the Democratic Party (DP), and the Muslim Congress Party (MCP). The 1960 constitution had established a House of Representatives, and in the 1960 election no party won a majority of seats. However, in 1961 the British Governor chose UP leader Pierre Sarr N'Jie to serve as the country's first head of government, in the form of a Chief Minister. This was an unpopular decision, and the 1962 election was notable as parties were able to appeal to ethnic and religious differences across the Gambia. The PPP won a majority, and formed a coalition with the Democratic Congress Alliance (DCA; a merger of the DP and MCP). They invited the UP to the coalition in 1963, but it left in 1965.

The UP was seen as the main opposition party, but it lost power from 1965 to 1970. In 1975, the National Convention Party (NCP) was formed by Sheriff Mustapha Dibba, and became the new main opposition party to the PPP's dominance. Both the PPP and NCP were ideologically similar, so in the 1980s a new opposition party emerged, in the form of the radical socialist People's Democratic Organisation for Independence and Socialism (PDOIS). However, between the 1966 and 1992 elections, the PPP was "overwhelmingly dominant", winning between 55% and 70% of the vote in each election and a large majority of seats continually.

In principle, competitive politics existed during the Jawara era, however, it was stated that there was in reality a "one-party monopoly of state power centred around the dominant personality of Dawda Jawara." Civil society was limited post-independence, and opposition parties were weak and at the risk of being declared subversive. The opposition did not have equal access to resources, as the business class refused to finance them. The government had control over when they could make public announcements and press briefings, and there were also allegations of vote-buying and improprieties in the preparation of the electoral register. A 1991 court challenge by the PDOIS against irregularities on the electoral register in Banjul was dismissed on a technicality.

In July 1994, a bloodless military coup d'état brought an end to the Jawara era. The Armed Forces Provisional Ruling Council (AFPRC), led by Yahya Jammeh, ruled dictatorially for two years. The council suspended the constitution, banned all political parties, and imposed a dusk-to-dawn curfew on the populace. A transition back to democracy occurred in 1996, and a new constitution was written, though the process was manipulated to benefit Jammeh. In a 1996 referendum, 70% of voters approved the constitution, and in December 1996 Jammeh was elected as president. All but PDOIS of the pre-coup parties were banned, and former ministers were barred from public office.

During Jammeh's rule, the opposition was again fragmented. An example was the infighting between members of the National Alliance for Democracy and Development (NADD) that was formed in 2005. Jammeh used the police forces to harass opposition members and parties. Jammeh was also accused of human rights abuses, especially towards human rights activists, civil society organisations, political opponents, and the media. Their fates included being sent into exile, harassment, arbitrary imprisonment, murder, and forced disappearance. Particular examples include the murder of journalist Deyda Hydara in 2004, a student massacre at a protest in 2000, public threats to kill human rights defenders in 2009, and public threats towards homosexuals in 2013. Furthermore, Jammeh made threats to the religious freedom of non-Muslims, used 'mercenary judges' to weaken the judiciary, and faced numerous accusations of election rigging.

In the December 2016 presidential election, Jammeh was beaten by Adama Barrow, who was backed by a coalition of opposition parties. Jammeh's initial agreement to step down followed by a change of mind induced a constitutional crisis that culminated in a military intervention by ECOWAS forces in January 2017. Barrow pledged to serve at the head of a three-year transitional government. The Nigerian Centre for Democracy and Development describe the challenges facing Barrow as needing to restore "citizen's trust and confidence in the public sector". They describe a "fragile peace" with tensions in rural areas between farmers and the larger communities. They also reported on tensions between ethnic groups developing. An example is that in February 2017, 51 supporters of Jammeh were arrested for harassing supporters of Barrow. Although his election was initially met with enthusiasm, the Centre notes that this has been dampened by Barrow's initial constitutional faux pas with his vice president, the challenge of inclusion, and high expectations post-Jammeh.

On 5 December 2021, Incumbent president Adama Barrow was declared the winner of The Gambia's presidential election by the electoral commission. The 4 December 2021 election, the first since former dictator Yahya Jammeh fled into exile, was seen as crucial for the young democracy.

Constitution
The Gambia has had a number of constitutions in its history. The two most significant are the 1970 constitution, which established the Gambia as a presidential republic, and the 1996 constitution, which served as a basis for Jammeh's rule and was kept following Barrow's victory in 2016. Jammeh manipulated the 1996 constitutional reform process to benefit himself. No reference was made to term limits, indicating Jammeh's preference to stay in power for an extended period of time. According to the 1996 constitution, the President is the head of state, head of government, and commander-in-chief of the armed forces. Jammeh and Barrow have also both taken on the role of Minister of Defence.

Presidency
The president appoints the vice president and cabinet of ministers and also chairs the cabinet. The office of Prime Minister was abolished in 1970. Total executive power is vested in the president. He can also appoint five members of the National Assembly, the judges of the superior courts, regional governors, and district chiefs. In terms of the civil service, he can appoint the Public Service Commission, the ombudsman, and the Independent Electoral Commission. The president is directly elected for five-year terms based on a simple majority of votes. There are no term limits. The Constitution is under review as of 2018 and a two-term limit and other changes required to enhance the governance structures are expected.

Foreign relations

The Gambia followed a formal policy of non-alignment throughout most of former President Jawara's tenure. It maintained close relations with the United Kingdom and with Senegal and other African countries. The July 1994 coup strained the Gambia's relationship with Western powers, particularly the United States, which until 2002 suspended most non-humanitarian assistance in accordance with Section 508 of the Foreign Assistance Act. After 1995 President Jammeh established diplomatic relations with several additional countries, including Libya (suspended in 2010), and Cuba. The People's Republic of China cut ties with the Gambia in 1995 – after the latter established diplomatic links with Taiwan – and re-established them in 2016.

As a member of the Economic Community of West African States (ECOWAS), the Gambia has played an active role in that organisation's efforts to resolve the civil wars in Liberia and Sierra Leone and contributed troops to the community's ceasefire monitoring group (ECOMOG) in 1990 and (ECOMIL) in 2003. In November 2019, the Gambia filed a case against Myanmar in The Hague, accusing its military of genocide against Myanmar's ethnic Rohingya community.

Under Yahya Jammeh The Gambia was also backing up rebels of MFDC in Casamance in southern Senegal. The subsequent worsening of the human rights situation placed increasing strains on US–Gambian relations.

The Gambia withdrew from the Commonwealth of Nations on 3 October 2013, with the government stating it had "decided that the Gambia will never be a member of any neo-colonial institution and will never be a party to any institution that represents an extension of colonialism". Under the new president, the Gambia began the process of returning to its status as a republic in the Commonwealth of Nations with the support of the British government, formally presenting its application to re-join the Commonwealth of Nations to Secretary-General Patricia Scotland on 22 January 2018.

The Gambia returned to its status as a republic in the Commonwealth of Nations on 8 February 2018.

List of international organization memberships
 Commonwealth of Nations
 Economic Community of West African States (ECOWAS)
 Organization of Islamic Cooperation
 United Nations
 African Union

Military

The Gambia Armed Forces (GAF) was created in 1985 as a stipulation of the Senegambia Confederation, a political union between the Gambia and Senegal. It originally consisted of the Gambia National Army (GNA), trained by the British, and Gambia National Gendarmerie (GNG), trained by the Senegalese. The GNG was merged into the police in 1992, and in 1997 Jammeh created a Gambia Navy (GN). Attempts to create a Gambia Air Force in the mid-2000s ultimately fell through. In 2008, Jammeh created a National Republican Guard, composed of special forces units. The GNA has a strength of roughly 900, in two infantry battalions and an engineering company. It makes use of Ferret and M8 Greyhound armoured cars. The GN is equipped with patrol vessels, and Taiwan donated a number of new vessels to the force in 2013.

Since the GAF was formed in 1985, it has been active in UN and African Union peacekeeping missions. It has been classed as a Tier 2 peacekeeping contributor and was described by the Center on International Cooperation as a regional leader in peacekeeping. It dispatched soldiers to Liberia as part of ECOMOG from 1990 to 1991, during which two Gambian soldiers were killed. It has since contributed troops to ECOMIL, UNMIL, and UNAMID. Responsibility for the military has rested directly with the President since Jammeh seized power at the head of a bloodless military coup in 1994. Jammeh also created the role of Chief of the Defence Staff, who is the senior military officer responsible for the day-to-day operations of the Gambia Armed Forces. Between 1958 and 1985, the Gambia did not have a military, but the Gambia Field Force existed as a paramilitary wing of the police. The military tradition of the Gambia can be traced to the Gambia Regiment of the British Army, that existed from 1901 to 1958 and fought in World War I and World War II. In 2017, Gambia signed the UN treaty on the Prohibition of Nuclear Weapons.

The Gambia Armed Forces is and has been the recipient of a number of equipment and training agreements with other countries. In 1992, a contingent of Nigerian soldiers helped lead the GNA. Between 1991 and 2005, the Turkish armed forces helped train Gambian soldiers. It has also hosted British and United States training teams from the Royal Gibraltar Regiment and US AFRICOM.

Human rights

According to the World Health Organization, an estimated 78.3% of Gambian girls and women have suffered female genital mutilation. LGBT activity is illegal, and punishable with life imprisonment.

The Daily Observer reporter Ebrima Manneh is believed by human rights organizations to have been arrested in July 2006 and secretly held in custody since then. Manneh was reportedly arrested by Gambia's National Intelligence Agency after attempting to republish a BBC report criticizing President Yahya Jammeh. Amnesty International considers him to be a prisoner of conscience and named him a 2011 "priority case". In 2019 the Gambian newspaper The Trumpet reported that Manneh had died in captivity at some point in mid-2008.

Administrative divisions

The Gambia is divided into eight local government areas, including the national capital, Banjul, which is classified as a city. The divisions of the Gambia were created by the Independent Electoral Commission in accordance to Article 192 of the National Constitution.

The local government areas are further subdivided (2013) into 43 districts. Of these, Kanifing and Kombo Saint Mary (which shares Brikama as a capital with the Brikama Local Government Area) are effectively part of the Greater Banjul area.

Economy

The Gambia has a liberal, market-based economy characterised by traditional subsistence agriculture, a historic reliance on groundnuts (peanuts) for export earnings, a re-export trade built up around its ocean port, low import duties, minimal administrative procedures, a fluctuating exchange rate with no exchange controls, and a significant tourism industry.

The World Bank pegged Gambian GDP for 2018 at US$1,624M; the International Monetary Fund put it at US$977M for 2011.

From 2006 to 2012, the Gambian economy grew annually at a rate of 5–6% of GDP.

Agriculture accounts for roughly 30% of the gross domestic product (GDP) and employs about 70% of the labour force. Within agriculture, peanut production accounts for 6.9% of GDP, other crops 8.3%, livestock 5.3%, fishing 1.8%, and forestry 0.5%. Industry accounts for about 8% of GDP and services around 58%. The limited amount of manufacturing is primarily agricultural-based (e.g., peanut processing, bakeries, a brewery, and a tannery). Other manufacturing activities involve soap, soft drinks, and clothing.

Previously, the United Kingdom and the EU constituted the major Gambian export markets. However, in recent years Senegal, the United States, and Japan have become significant trade partners of the Gambia. In Africa, Senegal represented the biggest trade partner of the Gambia in 2007, which is a defining contrast to previous years that had Guinea-Bissau and Ghana as equally important trade partners. Globally, Denmark, the United States, and China have become important source countries for Gambian imports. The UK, Germany, Ivory Coast, and the Netherlands also provide a fair share of Gambian imports. The Gambian trade deficit for 2007 was $331 million.

In May 2009 twelve commercial banks existed in the Gambia, including one Islamic bank. The oldest of these, Standard Chartered Bank, dates its presence back to the entry in 1894 of what shortly thereafter became the Bank of British West Africa. In 2005 the Switzerland-based banking group International Commercial Bank established a subsidiary and now has four branches in the country. In 2007 Nigeria's Access Bank established a subsidiary that now has four branches in the country, in addition to its head office; the bank has pledged to open four more. 2008 saw the incorporation of Zenith Bank (Gambia) Limited, a subsidiary of Nigeria's behemoth Zenith Bank Plc, in the country. In May 2009 the Lebanese Canadian Bank opened a subsidiary called Prime Bank.

Since 2017, China has invested in Gambia as part of its Belt and Road Initiative. A major focus of Chinese activity in Gambia has been processing of locally caught fish for the production of fish meal for export. The economic and environmental impacts of fish meal production in Gambia are controversial.

Transportation

The system of transportation in the Gambia mixes both public and private operations and consists of a system of roads (both paved and unpaved), water and air transportation. The Trans-Gambia Highway runs along both sides of the river Gambia, which bisects the country. The river may be crossed by ferry or the Senegambia bridge. There are no railways in the country.

Roadways in the country run to a length of 3,742 km of which only 723 km is paved and the remaining 3,019 km remains unpaved.

The country has a total of 390 km of waterways, with the Port of Banjul being the only port, which is managed by the Gambia Ports Authority.

The country's only international airport is the Banjul International Airport at Yundum, which is 26 km away.

Demographics

The urbanisation rate  was 57.3%. Provisional figures from the 2003 census show the gap between the urban and rural populations narrowing as more areas are declared urban. While urban migration, development projects, and modernisation are bringing more Gambians into contact with Western habits and values, indigenous forms of dress and celebration and the traditional emphasis on the extended family remain integral parts of everyday life.

The United Nations Development Programme (UNDP) Human Development Report for 2010 ranks the Gambia 151st out of 169 countries on its Human Development Index, putting the country in the "Low Human Development" category. This index compares life-expectancy, years of schooling, gross national income (GNI) per capita and other factors.

The total fertility rate (TFR) was estimated at 3.98 children per woman in 2013.

Ethnic groups

A variety of ethnic groups live in the Gambia, each preserving its own language and traditions. The Mandinka ethnicity is the most numerous, followed by the Fula, Wolof, Jola/Karoninka, Serahule / Jahanka, Serers, Manjago, Bambara, Aku Marabou, Bainunka and others, such as Tukulor. The Krio people, locally known as Akus, constitute one of the smallest ethnic minorities in the Gambia. They descend from Sierra Leone Creole people and have traditionally concentrated in the capital.

The roughly 3,500 non-African residents include Europeans and families of Lebanese origin (0.23% of the total population). Most of the European minority is British, although many of the British left after independence.

Languages

English is the official language of the Gambia and is thus used for official purposes and education. Other languages include Mandinka, Wolof, Fula, Serer, Soninke, Krio, Jola and other indigenous vernaculars. Owing to the country's geographical setting, knowledge of French (an official language in much of West Africa) is relatively widespread.

Mandinka is spoken as a first language by 38% of the population, Pulaar by 21%, Wolof by 18%, Soninke by 9%, Jola by 4.5%, Serer by 2.4%, Manjak and Bainouk by 1.6% each, Portuguese Creole by 1%, and English by 0.5%. Several other languages are spoken by smaller numbers. Gambian Sign Language is used by the deaf.

Education

The constitution mandates free and compulsory primary education in the Gambia. Lack of resources and of educational infrastructure has made implementation of this difficult. In 1995 the gross primary enrolment rate was 77.1% and the net primary enrolment rate was 64.7% School fees long prevented many children from attending school, but in February 1998 President Jammeh ordered the termination of fees for the first six years of schooling. Girls make up about 52% of primary-school pupils. The figure may be lower for girls in rural areas, where cultural factors and poverty prevent parents from sending girls to school. Approximately 20% of school-age children attend Quranic schools.

The International Open University (until January 2020 known as the Islamic Online University), a higher-education institution having more than 435,000 enrolled students from over 250 countries worldwide, has its global headquarters in the Gambia.

Health

Religion

Approximately 96% of the population identify as Sunni Muslim, mostly Malikite Sufi. Except for a tiny fraction of one percent, the remainder of the population are Christian. Article 25 of the constitution protects the rights of citizens to practise any religion that they choose and intermarriage between Muslims and Christians is common.

Islam
Virtually all commercial life in the Gambia comes to a standstill during major Muslim holidays, which include Eid al-Adha and Eid ul-Fitr. Most Muslims in the Gambia follow the Maliki school of jurisprudence. There is also a significant presence of the Ahmadiyya movement in the country. A Shiite Muslim community exists in the Gambia, mainly due to Lebanese and other Arab immigrants to the region. The vast majority of South-Asian immigrants are also Muslims.

Christianity
The Christian community comprises about 4% of the population. Residing in the western and southern parts of the Gambia, most members of the Christian community identify themselves as Roman Catholic. However, smaller Christian groups also exist, such as Anglicans, Methodists, Baptists, Seventh-day Adventists, Jehovah's Witnesses, and small evangelical denominations.

Traditional religions
It is unclear to what extent indigenous beliefs, such as the Serer religion, continue to be practised. Serer religion encompasses cosmology and a belief in a supreme deity called Roog. Some of its religious festivals include the Xooy, Mbosseh, and Randou Rande. Each year, adherents of Serer religion make the annual pilgrimage to Sine in Senegal for the Xooy divination ceremony. Serer religion also has a rather significant imprint on Senegambian Muslim society in that Senegambian Muslim festivals such as "Tobaski", "Gamo", "Koriteh" and "Weri Kor" have names representing loanwords from the Serer religion – they were ancient Serer festivals.

Like the Serers, the Jola people have their own religious customs, including a major religious ceremony, Boukout.

Other religions
Owing to a small number of immigrants from South Asia, Hindus and followers of the Baháʼí Faith are also present.

Culture

Although the Gambia is the smallest country on mainland Africa, its culture is the product of very diverse influences. The national borders outline a narrow strip on either side of the River Gambia, a body of water that has played a vital part in the nation's destiny and is known locally simply as "the River". Without natural barriers, the Gambia has become home to most of the ethnic groups that are present throughout western Africa, especially those in Senegal.

Europeans also figure prominently in Gambian history because the River Gambia is navigable deep into the continent, a geographic feature that made this area one of the most profitable sites for the slave trade from the 15th through the 17th centuries. (It also made it strategic to the halt of this trade once it was outlawed in the 19th century.) Some of this history was popularised in the Alex Haley book and TV series Roots, which was set in the Gambia.

Music

The music of the Gambia is closely linked musically with that of its neighbour, Senegal, which surrounds its inland frontiers completely. It fuses popular Western music and dance, with sabar, the traditional drumming and dance music of the Wolof and Serer people of Senegal.

Cuisine

The cuisine of the Gambia includes peanuts, rice, fish, meat, onions, tomatoes, cassava, chili peppers and oysters from the River Gambia. In particular, yassa and domoda curries are popular with locals and tourists.

Literature 

As with other West African countries, the Gambia has a tradition of oral literature, including the griots, traditional storytellers and musicians. Since the 1960s, an English-language Gambian literature has emerged. Lenrie Peters is considered the founding father of this literature, whilst notable writers include Tijan Sallah, Nana Grey-Johnson and Mariama Khan.

Media
Critics have accused the government of restricting free speech. A 2002 law created a commission with the power to issue licenses and imprison journalists; in 2004, additional legislation allowed prison sentences for libel and slander and cancelled all print and broadcasting licenses, forcing media groups to re-register at five times the original cost.

Three Gambian journalists have been arrested since the coup attempt. It has been suggested that they were imprisoned for criticising the government's economic policy, or for stating that a former interior minister and security chief was among the plotters. Newspaper editor Deyda Hydara was shot to death under unexplained circumstances, days after the 2004 legislation took effect.

Licensing fees are high for newspapers and radio stations, and the only nationwide stations are tightly controlled by the government.

Reporters Without Borders has accused "President Yahya Jammeh's police state" of using murder, arson, unlawful arrest and death threats against journalists.

In December 2010 Musa Saidykhan, former editor of The Independent newspaper, was awarded US$200,000 by the ECOWAS Court in Abuja, Nigeria. The court found the Government of the Gambia guilty of torture while he was detained without trial at the National Intelligence Agency. Apparently he was suspected of knowing about the 2006 failed coup.

Sports
As in neighbouring Senegal, the national and most popular sport in the Gambia is wrestling. Association football and basketball are also popular. Football in the Gambia is administered by the Gambia Football Federation, who are affiliated to both FIFA and CAF. The GFA runs league football in the Gambia, including top division GFA League First Division, as well as the Gambia national football team. Nicknamed "The Scorpions", the national side have never qualified for the FIFA World Cup, but qualified for the Africa Cup of Nations at senior level for the first time in 2021. They play at Independence Stadium. The Gambia won two CAF U-17 championships one in 2005 when the country hosted, and 2009 in Algeria automatically qualifying for FIFA U-17 World Cup in Peru (2005) and Nigeria (2009) respectively. The U-20 also qualified for FIFA U-20 2007 in Canada. The female U-17 also competed in FIFA U-17 World Cup 2012 in Azerbaijan.

The Gambia featured a national team in beach volleyball that competed at the 2018–2020 CAVB Beach Volleyball Continental Cup in both the women's and the men's section.

See also

 Index of Gambia-related articles
 Outline of the Gambia

Explanatory notes

References

Citations

Works cited

External links

Government
 State House and Office of the President

General information
 Gambia Guide – Comprehensive information
 Gambia Daily news – Daily news from the Gambia through various media sources
 The Gambia – A comprehensive website about the Gambia
 
 The Gambia from UCB Libraries GovPubs
 
 The Gambia from the BBC News
 
 
 Key Development Forecasts for the Gambia from International Futures

Tourism
 Visit the Gambia – The official website of the Gambia Tourism Board.
 Birdwatching in the Gambia – Website about birdwatching in the Gambia including photo galleries of Gambian birds

Trade
 Gambia 2011 Trade Summary Statistics

 
1965 establishments in the Gambia
Republics in the Commonwealth of Nations
Economic Community of West African States
English-speaking countries and territories
Former British protectorates
Least developed countries
Member states of the African Union
Member states of the Commonwealth of Nations
Member states of the Organisation of Islamic Cooperation
Member states of the United Nations
Republics
States and territories established in 1965
West African countries
Countries in Africa
1965 establishments in Africa